Queshan County is a county under the prefecture-level city of Zhumadian, Henan Province, China.

Administrative divisions
As 2017, this county is divided to 3 subdistricts and 10 towns.
Subdistricts
Panlong Subdistrict
Sanlihe Subdistrict
Langling Subdistrict
Towns

-Former Towns and Townships:
Yifeng, Shigunhe Township and Wagang Township

Climate

References

County-level divisions of Henan
Zhumadian